The president of the Hawaii Senate is the presiding officer of the upper chamber of the Hawaii Territorial and Hawaii State Legislature.

Territorial Senate

After statehood

Sources
http://www.capitol.hawaii.gov
http://lrbhawaii.org/hndbook/appe.html

 
Politics of Hawaii
Hawaii
Presidents of the Hawaii Senate